The 1970 Cleveland Browns season was the team's 21st season with the National Football League. The Browns attempted to improve on its 10-3-1 record from 1969. The team would fail to do so, and they finished with an even 7-7 record and missed the postseason. This was the first season that the Browns would play the Cincinnati Bengals, their new arch-rival in the AFC Central. The 2 teams split their 2 meetings in the first season series.

Season summary 
The merger between the NFL and AFL was complete, with the leagues now playing each other in the regular season for the first time. This was the last step in a four-year process that began in January 1967 with the champions from both leagues playing in Super Bowl I.

To finish the merger, the Browns, along with the Pittsburgh Steelers and Baltimore Colts, agreed to move in 1970 from the NFL to the old AFL, renamed the AFC, to balance the leagues, now called conferences (NFC and AFC), at 13 clubs each. The merger had hit a stalemate when none of the NFL teams initially wanted to jump to what many of the old-line NFL people felt was an inferior league overall.

Concerning just the Browns themselves, there was the situation involving Blanton Collier. Although no one except maybe the man himself knew it at the start of the season, this was going to be the last year for the venerable head coach. Plagued by hearing problems, the 64-year-old coach announced his retirement before the end of the 1970 season, which the Browns finished with a 7–7 record. Collier told owner Art Modell that he could no longer hear his players, and it was difficult to read their lips through new face masks that obscured their mouths. Modell tried to help by getting Collier to try new hearing aids and even sent him for acupuncture treatment, but none of it worked. Collier struggled during press conferences because he often could not hear what reporters were asking and answered the wrong questions. In eight years as coach, Collier led Cleveland to a championship and a 76–34–2 record. Nick Skorich, who came to the Browns as offensive coordinator in 1964, was named as his replacement in 1971. Collier had been on the job since 1963 and guided the Browns to the NFL championship a year later.

Paul Warfield trade to Dolphins 

Realizing quarterback Bill Nelsen's aching knees were on borrowed time, the Browns had made a blockbuster trade with the Miami Dolphins on the eve of the 1970 NFL Draft to get the rights to select the man they felt would be their passer of the future, Mike Phipps. But it came at a steep price, for they had to give up Pro Football Hall of Fame wide receiver Paul Warfield in the process. That loss, coupled with Nelsen's physical condition and the unfamiliarity with the personnel on the former AFL clubs they were playing for the first time, took the starch out of what had been a good offense going all the way back to 1963. The result was the Browns scored 65 less points than they had the year before, and 108 less than two seasons before.

Along with that, the defense, though it gave up 35 fewer points than it had in 1969, just could not make up the difference, led to the Browns finishing 7–7, only the second non-winning mark in club history. In spite of that, the season started well for the Browns, as they opened 3–1 and then were 4–2.

First Monday Night Football game 
The Browns beat Joe Namath and the New York Jets 31–21 at Cleveland Municipal Stadium in the opener in the first Monday Night Football game in history, and, three games later, edged Cincinnati 30–27 in Bengals head coach Paul Brown's first official visit to Cleveland since being fired by the Browns eight years before.

Offseason

NFL Draft 
The following were selected in the 1970 NFL Draft.

Exhibition schedule 

There was a doubleheader on September 5, 1970 Cardinals vs Chargers and Vikings vs Browns.

Regular season schedule 

Note: Intra-division opponents are in bold text.

Season summary

Week 4 
In the first regular-season matchup between Paul Brown's old team and his new one, the Browns beat the Bengals. It's an important win for the Browns, who we're chastised for losing a preseason game to Cincinnati. Running backs Leroy Kelly and Bo Scott combined for 236 yards, and a fired up defense sets the early tone when defensive tackle Walter Johnson sacks Bengals quarterback Virgil Carter for a safety.

Standings

Personnel

Staff

Roster

References

External links 
 1970 Cleveland Browns at Pro Football Reference
 1970 Cleveland Browns Statistics at jt-sw.com
 1970 Cleveland Browns Schedule at jt-sw.com
 1970 Cleveland Browns at DatabaseFootball.com

Bibliography 
 

Cleveland
Cleveland Browns seasons
Cleveland Browns